Sekhukhuneland or Sekukuniland is a natural region in north-east South Africa, located in the historical Transvaal zone, former Transvaal Province, also known as Bopedi (meaning “land of Bapedi”). The region is named after the 19th-century King, Sekhukhune I.

Geography
This region is mainly covered by grassland and was inhabited traditionally by the Bapedi in an area stretching across central and northern Transvaal.

Sekhukhuneland lies in present-day Limpopo and Mpumalanga provinces, between the Olifants River (Lepelle) and its tributary the Steelpoort River (Tubatse); bordered on the east by the Drakensberg Range, and crossed by the Thaba Ya Sekhukhune in the southeast and the Leolo Mountains in the north.

History
At the height of the Pedi power under Thulare, about 1790–1820, historical Sekhukhuneland included an area stretching from the site of present-day Rustenburg in the west to the Lowveld in the east, and ranging as far south as the Vaal river.

The area under Pedi control was severely limited after the military campaigns by British troops in 1879. Following their defeat native reserves were created for the Pedi and for other northern Sotho people groups by the Transvaal Republic's Native Location Commission.

Between 1972 and 1994 part of Sekhukhuneland was included in the Lebowa bantustan. The territory was not contiguous, being divided into two major and several minor portions. Having been intended as a homeland for the Northern Sotho-speaking tribes such as the Pedi, Lebowa included swathes of Sekukuniland. However, various other non-Northern Sotho-speaking tribes, including the Northern Ndebele, Batswana and VhaTsonga lived in the bantustan as well.

Sekukuniland is named after Pedi chief Sekhukhune or Sekukuni, who succeeded Sekwati in 1860 or 1861, and it is the only native region in South Africa named after a famous local chief. Present day Sekhukhune District Municipality in Limpopo Province is named after this natural region.

South African artist Johannes Segogela, renowned internationally for his wooden sculptures, was born in Sekukuniland in 1936.

See also
History of South Africa
Lebowa
Limpopo Province
Sekukhune Flat Lizard
The Contemporary African Art Collection (CAAC)

References

Bibliography

A L Hall, The geology of Sekukuniland : an explanation of sheet 8 (Sekukuniland), Government Printing and Sationery Office, Pretoria 1911

External links
Map of Sekhukhuneland
The 50th Anniversary Of The Sekhukhuneland Revolt
The Sekhukhuneland Terror
The Loreto Mission, Glen Cowie, Sekukuniland
The Nepheline Rocks of Sekukuniland
Trachoma in the South African Bantu; a survey in Sekukuniland
Landscape of Sekukuniland
A variant of Acacia karroo from Sekukuniland
The Sepedi Language
Sekhukhune Region - Tourism

Regions of Africa
Former subdivisions of South Africa
History of South Africa
Natural regions of South Africa